Arabella Campbell is a Canadian artist based in Vancouver, British Columbia. She graduated with a Bachelor of Arts from the University of British Columbia in 1996, and a Bachelor of Fine Arts from Emily Carr University of Art and Design (renamed in 2008) in 2002. She attended the San Francisco Art Institute from 1998 to 2000. She has exhibited locally, nationally, and internationally. She works out of a warehouse studio in False Creek Flats, Vancouver.

Early life
Born in Vancouver in 1973, Campbell grew up in remote Loughborough Inlet, in coastal British Columbia. Campbell was homeschooled for ten years, she later graduated from Shawnigan Lake School. Campbell studied painting in Southern France before returning to British Columbia to pursue a BA (with a focus on art history) from the University of British Columbia.

Artistic practice
Writing for Artspeak, Cindy Richmond has described Campbell's work as a "confirmation of Minimalism's continued vitality. Her monochrome paintings, site-specific installations and sculptures allow her to explore issues implicit to a stripped-down aesthetic and examine the context in which art is experienced." However, Neil Campbell (no relation) of Emily Carr University of Art and Design has argued that while "Arabella's paintings concern themselves with conceptual or formal strategies, I find my main response is to the aesthetic character of the work. The surfaces of her monochromes are rendered carefully, step by step, through a reverential application of paint. It's that observance that affects me." This, Neil Campbell argues, is intended on Arabella Campbell's part.

Campbell's "Physical Facts Series #6" won the 2007 RBC Canadian Painting Competition, which is the largest award for Canada's emerging artists. "Physical Facts Series #6" acknowledges "the support structure of the actual canvas," in a manner typical of her exploration of "the colours of gallery walls and the tools and methods of the painter." "Physical Facts Series #6" has been praised as achieving "intelligent results [that] both critique and glorify the medium of painting."

Campbell's work for "Painting After Poverty" reconsidered "what is held to be peripheral to a work of art...in her attempt to calibrate from memory the precise shade of white paint used by three art institutions upon their walls."

Local impact
Campbell's work is a part of the Audain Art Museum's permanent collection of British Columbian art, and Square Process Paintings; Right Tilted, Left Tilted was featured as a part of Masterworks from the Audain Art Museum, which seeks to highlight 57 works in the museum's permanent collection as representative of "two hundred years of British Columbia's remarkable visual art".

Campbell has also been named as one of Vancouver's '7 New Painters' alongside Etienne Zack, Matthew Brown, Tim Gardner, Holger Kalberg, Elizabeth McIntosh, and Charlie Roberts.

Campbell herself has embraced a "location-based identification" with Vancouver and British Columbia, its spirit of "rigour and frontier freedom," and the artistic freedom afforded by its isolation from "any other substantial art centre".

Solo exhibitions
 "Arabella Campbell", March 25 – April 30, 2011, Catriona Jeffries Gallery, Vancouver, British Columbia.
 "Taken from there to "here to where it came from and taken to a place and used in such a manner that it can only remain as a representation of what it was where it came from"", 2008, Artspeak, Vancouver, British Columbia.
 "Arabella Campbell", June 8 – July 7, 2007, Catriona Jeffries Gallery, Vancouver, British Columbia.

Select group exhibitions
 "Poetics of Space," 2019, Kelowna Art Gallery, British Columbia
 "Poetics of Space," 2018, Nanaimo Art Gallery, Nanaimo, British Columbia
 "Entangled: Two Views on Contemporary Canadian Painting," September 30, 2017 - January 1, 2018, Vancouver Art Gallery, Vancouver, British Columbia
 "Kitchen Midden", September 25, 2016 - January 14, 2017, Griffin Art Projects, North Vancouver, BC
 "Readymades" Gordon Smith Gallery, North Vancouver, British Columbia
 "Masterworks from the Audain Art Museum," 2016, Audian Art Museum, Whistler, British Columbia
 "Cámara de maravillas: últimos días en sala," April 20 – June 26, 2016, Museo de Arte Moderno, Medellín, Colombia. Curated by Jens Hoffmann.
 "Cámara de maravillas," October 7, 2015 – February 14, 2016, Centro de la Imagen, Ciudad de México, México. Curated by Jens Hoffmann.
 "Poetics of Space", January 31 - May 24, 2015, Vancouver Art Gallery, Vancouver, British Columbia
 "Gordon Smith Collection," March 14 - May 14, 2015, West Vancouver Museum, West Vancouver, BC
 "TBD," September 6 – October 26, 2014, Museum of Contemporary Art Toronto Canada (now the Museum of Contemporary Canadian Art), Toronto, Ontario. Curated by Su-Ying Lee.
 "Who's Afraid of Purple, Orange and Green?," April 25 – June 20, 2014, Dunlop Art Gallery, Regina, Saskatchewan. Curated by Jennifer Matotek.
 "Landscape Revised," December 2013, Kamloops Art Gallery, Kamloops, British Columbia. Curated by Charo Neville.
 "The Painting Project: A Snapshot of Painting in Canada," June 7 – July 6, 2013, Galerie de l'UQAM, Montreal, Quebec. Curated by Julie Bélisle.
 "When Attitudes Become Form Become Attitudes," February 1 – March 31, 2013, Museum of Contemporary Art Detroit, Detroit. Curated by Jens Hoffmann.
 "Color Shift," January 10 – February 9, 2013, Mixed Greens, New York City. Curated by Jordan Tate.
 "When Attitudes Become Form Become Attitudes," September 13 – December 1, 2012, CCA Wattis Institute for Contemporary Arts, San Francisco. Curated by Jens Hoffmann.
 "Shore, Forest and Beyond: Art from the Audain Collection," October 29, 2011 - January 29, 2012, Vancouver Art Gallery,  Vancouver
 "Everything Everyday", October 2, 2010 – January 16, 2011, Vancouver Art Gallery, Vancouver, British Columbia. Curated by Bruce Grenville.
 "Stowaways," 2009, CCA Wattis, San Francisco, California
 "The Museum as Medium," October 23, 2008 – January 3, 2009, Koldo Mitxelena Kulturunea, Donostia-San Sebastián, Basque Autonomous Community, Spain. Curated by Pablo Fanego and Pedro de Llano.
 "The Museum as Medium," June 20 – September 21, 2008, Museo de Arte Contemporánea de Vigo, Vigo, Spain. Curated by Pablo Fanego and Pedro de Llano.
 "THIS IS NOT A VOID," October 25, 2008 – January 22, 2009, Galeria Luisa Strina, São Paulo, Brazil.
 "Past as Present," 2008, York Art Gallery, York, England
 "Very Abstract and Hyper Figurative," 2007, Thomas Dane Gallery, London, England. Curated by Jens Hoffmann
 "FOR SALE," 2007, Cristina Guerra Contemporary Art, Lisbon, Portugal. Curated by Jens Hoffmann.
 "Painting After Poverty", April 8 – May 14, 2007, Catriona Jeffries Gallery, Vancouver, British Columbia.
 "The Monochromatic Field: Works From The Collection", January 12 – March 11, 2006, Morris and Helen Belkin Art Gallery, Vancouver, British Columbia.
 "A Modern Life: Art and Design in British Columbia 1945-1960," 2004, Vancouver Art Gallery, Vancouver, British Columbia

Public Art
In 2011, Campbell created Lines in Architecture and Art, a landscape photomural which was installed at the Canada Line Vancouver City Centre Station on the corner of Granville and Georgia streets. The work was commissioned by the City of Vancouver Public Art Program and was a part of Vancouver 125.

Permanent collections
Campbell's work can be found in the permanent collections of the Audain Art Museum Morris and Helen Belkin Art Gallery; Vancouver Art Gallery; West Vancouver Museum;, Oakville Galleries, Oakville, Ontario; Lodeveans Collection, UK; Rennie Collection, Vancouver; and the RBC Canadian Art Collection.

Awards and residencies
 Glenfiddich Artist in Residence, Glenfiddich Distillery, Dufftown, Scotland. (2009) 
 National Winner, 9th annual RBC Canadian Painting Competition. (2007)
 Art for Excellence prize, Canada Millennium Scholarship Foundation. (2002)

Gallery

Further listening
 The CIAC (Colección Isabel y Agustín Coppel) has produced apps (android, apple) for Cámara de maravillas/Camera of Wonders (2016) featuring interviews with curator Jens Hoffman, Wonne Ickx of PRODUCTORA, and artists from the show. Also available for viewing and listening are the relevant images, narrations, and texts.

References 

1973 births
Artists from Vancouver
Canadian installation artists
Canadian women artists
Living people
Canadian contemporary painters
University of British Columbia alumni
Shawnigan Lake School alumni